The Rurality Movement (LMR ), formerly Hunting, Fishing, Nature and Traditions (CPNT ) is an agrarianist political party in France that aims to defend the traditional values of rural France. Its leader is Eddie Puyjalon. The party states it is neither right nor left but represents rural people on the whole in their diversity.

The party was a member of the presidential majority of Nicolas Sarkozy.

History

Formed in 1985, it contested both the European elections of 1989 and 1994 without success. In 1999, it obtained six seats, led by Jean Saint-Josse who was at the top of the list. It lost all representation at the following election to the European Parliament in 2004, when it obtained less than the minimum 3% of votes that allow a party to be reimbursed for campaign expenses. Consequently, it faced a deficit of 300,000 euros. At one stage, it had 32 regional councillors, but lost all of them in that same year. After these problems, most members of the CPNT have joined the Union for a Popular Movement (UMP) or the Movement for France, but the party is still in existence, and nominated Frédéric Nihous, a hunter from Northern France, as a candidate in the Presidential election of 2007. Nihous won 1.15% of votes only, much lower than Jean Saint-Josse in 2002.

In the 2009 European Parliament election, the party ran as the junior partner of the Movement for France under the etiquette of the Libertas political movement led by Irish businessman Declan Ganley. They won 4.8% of the vote, but only one seat, that of MPF leader Philippe de Villiers.

In August 2009, CPNT President Frédéric Nihous announced interest in joining the Liaison Committee for the Presidential Majority, which co-ordinates the parties which support the policies of President Nicolas Sarkozy.

After the standing down of Frédéric Nihous in March 2016, Eddie Puyjalon assumed the leadership of the party.

Presidents
André Goustat (1989–1998)
Jean Saint-Josse (1998–2008)
Frédéric Nihous (2008–2016)
Eddie Puyjalon (2016– )

Popular support and electoral record

CPNT is strong in certain rural areas of France with an important community of hunters. It is strong in the Somme River estuary to the west of Abbeville, in the Manche department and the Gironde department. In the 1999 European election, CPNT won 25% of the vote in the Somme, 15.4% in the Manche, 15.2% in the Landes department and 11.9% in Gironde. In stark contrast, the party barely won 1% of the vote that year in the Alsatian department of Bas-Rhin and did poorly in the east of France, much more industrialized and much less agrarian.

CPNT has three general councillors: one in the Somme, one in Gironde and one in the Hérault department.

Presidential

Legislative

European Parliament

See also
 :Category:Hunting, Fishing, Nature and Traditions politicians
 Jean Saint-Josse
 Frédéric Nihous
 Outdoor Recreation New Zealand, similar party in New Zealand
 Outdoor Recreation Party, similar party in Australia
 Party of Greek Hunters, similar party in Greece
 Shooters, Fishers and Farmers Party, similar party in Australia

References

External links
CPNT web site - in French

Right-wing parties in France
Libertas.eu
Agrarian parties
Political parties of the French Fifth Republic
Political parties established in 1989
Recreational political parties
Eurosceptic parties in France
1989 establishments in France
Hunting in France